Pachymerellus is a genus of two species of centipedes, in the family Geophilidae. It was described by American biologist Ralph Vary Chamberlin in 1920.

Species
Valid species:
 Pachymerellus dentifer (Chamberlin, 1943)
 Pachymerellus zygethus Chamberlin, 1920

References

 

 
 
Centipede genera
Animals described in 1920
Taxa named by Ralph Vary Chamberlin